Shuffle! is an anime series adapted from the visual novel of the same title by Navel. Produced by Asread and directed by Naoto Hosoda, the series was broadcast on WOWOW from July 7, 2005 to January 5, 2006 and continued its run on Chiba Television Broadcasting and Television Saitama with Shuffle! Memories from January 6 to March 25, 2007. It follows the adventures of Rin Tsuchimi and his friends Kaede Fuyou, Asa Shigure, Lisianthus, Nerine and Primula. The anime combines elements from the characters' paths from the game into one plot, although it differs from the game by adding some elements, such as the idol clubs formed around Sia, Nerine, and Kaede, and removing others, such as the H-scenes. A DVD containing an animated short, titled Shuffle! Prologue was released on May 27, 2005. Happinet Pictures released Shuffle! on twelve DVD compilations, each containing two episodes, between October 28, 2005 to September 29, 2006.

In 2007, Funimation licensed the anime adaptation of Shuffle! for an English-language dubbed release in North America. Funimation released the series across six Region 1 DVD compilation volumes from February 26 to September 9, 2008. The sixth DVD volume featured an artbox and Lisianthus' "god" panties. Funimation later released a DVD boxset on March 31, 2009 compiling all the six DVD volumes.

The background music for the series was composed by Acchorike, Kazuhiko Sawaguchi and Minoru Maruo. The prologue episode uses a single piece of theme music: the ending theme, titled "Mirage Lullaby", is performed by Yuria. The first season uses two pieces of theme music: an opening theme and ending theme. The opening theme, titled "You", is also performed by Yuria. The ending theme is "Innocence" performed by Miyuki Hashimoto.

Shuffle! (2005-06)

Shuffle! Memories (2007)
Shuffle! Memories is the next anime adaptation of Shuffle! which began airing on January 6, 2007. It primarily is a series of recap episodes that describes the events of Shuffle! for the main female characters.  Only the last episode contains 100% original scenes.

Opening and ending themes

Shuffle! Memories
All themes are performed by the voice actresses for the specific character that the episodes focus on. For information on the music see List of Shuffle! albums.
Opening themes
"Fateful Encounters" by YURIA
"Memories" by Yuko Goto
"High Tension Dreamer" by Itou Miki
"Pray" by Nagami Haruka
"Girigiri Heart Connection" by Aoki Sayaka
"Pureness" by Hitomi
Ending themes
"Innocence" by Miyuki Hashimoto
"Only one, only love" by Yuko Goto
"Wish" by Itou Miki
"Himitsu no Mori" by Haruka Nagami
"Freedom" by Aoki Sayaka
"Magical ☆ Powerstation" by Hitomi
"Natural Tone" by Miyuki Hashimoto

References
 General

 Specific

Episodes
Shuffle!